The following is a list of unproduced George Miller projects in roughly chronological order. During a career that has spanned over 40 years, George Miller has worked on projects which never progressed beyond the pre-production stage under his direction. A few of the projects were made after he had left production.

1980s

Roxanne
Following Mad Max, Miller was offered plenty of Hollywood jobs, but he turned most of them down he wanted to develop a rock and roll movie, the working title of which was Roxanne. After working together on the novelization of Mad Max, Miller and Terry Hayes teamed up in Los Angeles to write Roxanne, but the script was ultimately shelved. His would instead go on and direct Mad Max 2.

1990s

Contact
In 1993, Miller was hired to direct Contact based on the story by Carl Sagan and Ann Druyan. Contact commenced pre-production. Miller cast Jodie Foster in the lead role, approached Ralph Fiennes to play Palmer Joss and also considered casting Linda Hunt as the President of the United States. In addition to having aliens put on a laser lighting display around Earth, another version of the Goldenberg scripts had an alien wormhole swallow up the planet, transporting Earth to the center of the galaxy. Miller also asked Goldenberg to rewrite Contact in an attempt to portray the Pope as a key supporting character. Warner Bros. was hoping to have the film ready for release by Christmas 1996, but under Miller's direction pre-production lasted longer than expected. The studio  fired the director, blaming pushed-back start dates, budget concerns, and Miller's insistence that the script needed five more weeks of rewriting after working on the film for over a year. Robert Zemeckis was eventually brought on to direct.

2000s

Justice League: Mortal
In 2007, Miller signed on to direct a Justice League film titled Justice League: Mortal. The following month roughly 40 actors and actresses were auditioning for the ensemble superhero roles, among them were Joseph Cross, Michael Angarano, Max Thieriot, Minka Kelly, Adrianne Palicki and Scott Porter. Miller intended to cast younger actors as he wanted them to "grow" into their roles over the course of several films. D. J. Cotrona was cast as Superman, along with Armie Hammer as Batman. Jessica Biel reportedly declined the Wonder Woman role after being in negotiations. The character was also linked to actresses Teresa Palmer and Shannyn Sossamon, along with Mary Elizabeth Winstead, who confirmed that she had auditioned. Ultimately Megan Gale was cast as Wonder Woman, while Palmer was cast as Talia al Ghul, whom Miller had in mind to act with a Russian accent. The script for Justice League: Mortal would have featured the John Stewart character as the Green Lantern, a role originally offered to Columbus Short. Hip hop recording artist and rapper Common was cast, with Adam Brody as The Flash / Barry Allen, and Jay Baruchel as the lead villain, Maxwell Lord. Longtime Miller collaborator Hugh Keays-Byrne had been cast in an unnamed role, rumored to be Martian Manhunter. Aquaman had yet to be cast. Marit Allen was hired as the original costume designer before her untimely death in November 2007, and the responsibilities were assumed by Weta Workshop. While production was initially held up due to the 2007–08 Writers Guild of America strike, further production delays and the success of The Dark Knight led to Warner Bros. deciding to put the film on hold and pursue different options.

The Odyssey film
On October 17, 2008, Miller was planning on directing an adaptation of the Odyssey, set in space with Brad Pitt producing the movie for Warner Bros. On January 14, 2013, Warner Bros. revived the project, with a new script by James DiLapo, without Miller and Pitt's involvements. Since then, there have been no further announcements.

2010s

Fur Brigade
On November 29, 2011, Doug Mitchell revealed that Miller was attached to Fur Brigade, an animated bear movie. Since then, there have been no further announcements.

Happy Feet 3
In a November 2011 interview, Miller was asked if he had any plans for Happy Feet 3. He replied by saying: "if you put a gun to my head and said, 'You have to come up with a story for Happy Feet 3,' I'd say shoot me. I would have no idea. I really would have no idea. The stories creep up on you. You just have to allow the stories to come, and then they get in like little ear worms in your head and they won't go away. If that happens and we've got the energy, we'll do a third one. If it doesn't happen, it doesn't happen. That's the only way you can do it. It has to be authentic. I really wanted to make this film better than the first one. Otherwise, at my age, what's the point? You really want to make it better. If something comes up that's really exciting and I can convey that enthusiasm to other people, then there would be a third one."

Mad Max: Fury Road sequels and spinoffs
In 2011, Miller and McCarthy found during the writing process for Mad Max: Fury Road that they had enough story material for two additional scripts. One of these, entitled Mad Max: Furiosa, had already been completed, and Miller hoped to film it after the release of Fury Road. In March 2015, during an interview with Esquire, Hardy revealed that he was attached to star in three more Mad Max films following Fury Road. In May 2015, Miller told Wired: "Should Fury Road be successful, I've got two other stories to tell." Later in May, Miller revealed that plans for the sequel had changed and the fifth film in the franchise will instead be titled Mad Max: The Wasteland. In October 2015, Miller's team had two scripts for sequels which they ended up with during the writing process. Later that month, he clarified that Mad Max: The Wasteland was a working title for the sequel. Miller reaffirmed his intent to continue the franchise after reports to the contrary surfaced following an interview in January 2016. In November 2017, it was reported that a lawsuit filed by Miller's production company against Warner Bros. over a disputed $7 million bonus was likely to delay the production of any sequels. In July 2019, Miller told IndieWire: "There are two stories, both involving Mad Max, and also a Furiosa story. We're still solving, we've got to play out the Warners thing, it seems to be pretty clear that it's going to happen." Production of the sequels and spinoffs were delayed until after the lawsuit was settled. In October 2020, a prequel titled Furiosa entered "advanced development" at Warner Bros., with Miller set to direct. Anya Taylor-Joy has been cast to portray a young Furiosa, while Chris Hemsworth and Yahya Abdul-Mateen II will also star. Miller will co-write the screenplay with Nico Lathouris, while Miller and Doug Mitchell will produce through their Kennedy Miller Mitchell banner.

Akira remake
In 2015, Miller was planning on directing Akira, the live-action remake of the film of the same name, but he left due to scheduling conflicts with Mad Max: Fury Road.

Offers

The Batman 
On January 30, 2017, Miller was on the list to replace Ben Affleck as director of The Batman possibly with Affleck starring, but Matt Reeves got the job and made The Batman.

References

Lists of unrealized projects by artist
Unrealized projects